Ileana Pietrobruno is an independent Canadian filmmaker who has written, directed, edited and produced several short films and the following features: the erotic drama Girlfriend Experience, the pirate adventure Girl King, and the surreal Cat Swallows Parakeet and Speaks!. Pietrobruno's films have won awards and screened at festivals such as the Berlin International Film Festival and the Toronto International Film Festival.

Filmography
Window Horses (2016) – Editor
Girlfriend Experience (2008)
GFE: Girlfriend Experience (DVD title)	Distributor, Canada - Mongrel Media
Girl King (2002)				Distributor - Ariztical Entertainment
Cat Swallows Parakeet And Speaks! (1996)	Distributor - CFMDC
Narcissus (1996)
Zoo (1992)
The Chilliwack Princess (1990)
The Sisters of Gion (1987)
Spacing In (1986)

See also
 List of female film and television directors
 List of lesbian filmmakers
 List of LGBT-related films directed by women

References

External links
 
 Ileana Pietrobruno Blog 
 Ileana Pietrobruno at Queer Media Database Canada-Québec

Living people
Year of birth missing (living people)
Canadian film directors
Canadian film producers
Canadian women film directors
Canadian women film producers
Canadian women screenwriters
LGBT film directors
Canadian LGBT screenwriters
20th-century Canadian LGBT people
20th-century Canadian screenwriters
20th-century Canadian women writers
21st-century Canadian LGBT people
21st-century Canadian screenwriters
21st-century Canadian women writers